Dickinson County Courthouse may refer to:

Dickinson County Courthouse (Iowa), Spirit Lake, Iowa
Dickinson County Courthouse (Kansas), Abilene, Kansas
Dickinson County Courthouse and Jail, Iron Mountain, Michigan